The Norway men's national under-16 basketball team is a national basketball team of Norway, administered  by the Norges Basketballforbund. It represents the country in men's international under-16 basketball competitions.

FIBA U16 European Championship participations

See also
Norway men's national basketball team
Norway men's national under-18 basketball team
Norway women's national under-16 basketball team

References

External links
Official website 
Archived records of Norway team participations

Basketball in Norway
basketball
Men's national under-16 basketball teams